Vardahovit is a village in the Yeghegis Municipality of the Vayots Dzor Province in Armenia.

References

External links 

Populated places in Vayots Dzor Province